Jackson Page (born 8 August 2001 in Ebbw Vale, Blaenau Gwent) is a Welsh professional snooker player. He is a former European U-21 champion and the former Under-18 World Snooker Champion and in 2017 also became the Under-18 European Snooker Champion.

Career
In February 2016, Page entered the 2016 EBSA European Under-18 Snooker Championship as the number 13 seed and advanced to the final where he was defeated 2–5 by fellow countryman Tyler Rees. Later that year, Page competed in the 2016 IBSF World Under-18 Snooker Championship where he again advanced to the final and defeated the number 1 seed Yun Fung Tam 5–4.

At the age of 15, Page was awarded a wildcard to the 2017 Welsh Open. In the first round, he beat Jason Weston 4–3 on a re-spotted black. In the second round, he defeated John Astley by the same scoreline to reach the round of 32, before losing 0–4 to Judd Trump. In the qualifiers for the 2017 World Championship he was edged out 9–10 on the final pink by Martin O'Donnell in the first round.

Page turned professional in 2019 after winning the EBSA European Under-21 Snooker Championships in Israel. His best results from his first two seasons on the tour were reaching the last 16 of the September 2020 European Masters, where he was whitewashed 0–5 by Trump, and the last 32 of the 2020 Scottish Open, where he lost 1–4 to his mentor and practice partner Mark Williams. He was relegated from the main professional tour after losing 5–6 to Kacper Filipiak in the 2021 World Championship qualifiers. However, he quickly regained his professional standing, defeating Michael Georgiou at Q School to win another two-year tour card. He reached the last 16 of the 2021 Northern Ireland Open, but lost 3–4 to Ricky Walden despite having led 3–2.

In the 2022 World Snooker Championship qualifying rounds, Page won four matches, defeating opponents including Joe Perry and David Grace, to reach the main stage of the tournament. He made his Crucible debut against former world finalist Barry Hawkins and won his first-round match 10–7, making back-to-back total clearances of 128 and 135 in the final two frames. In the second round, Page again faced Williams, but lost the first seven frames and went on to a 3–13 defeat, losing the match with a session to spare. Williams made six centuries in the match.

Performance and rankings timeline

Career finals

Amateur finals: 8 (5 titles)

References

External links
Jackson Page at worldsnooker.com

Welsh snooker players
Living people
2001 births
Sportspeople from Ebbw Vale